An asmalyk (Turkmen language, "a thing to be hung") is a textile trapping used in a Turkmen wedding procession. Asmalyks may be pile or embroidered,  and are usually five-sided, but some are seven-sided. Yomut asmalyks are the most common, followed by those of the Tekke tribe. Asmalyks were made in  pairs to decorate the flanks of a bride's wedding  camel, and were then hung in her domed, felt-covered tent.

References

External links
Camel, bridal trappings and asmalyk, old photograph
A Rare "Jewelry" Asmalyk, Stylistic and Technical Analysis
Tekke "Bird" Asmalyk

Turkic rugs and carpets
Turkmenistan culture